Eric la Fleur (born 11 December 1979) is a Swedish former Olympic swimmer. He competed in the 2004 Summer Olympics, where he swam the 4×100 m freestyle relay preliminaries for the Swedish team that became disqualified.

Biography
La Fleur was born on 11 December 1979 in Lund to parents Lennart and Barbro la Fleur. He started his swimming career in the Lund swimming team SK Poseidon. His brother, Oscar la Fleur, is also a former swimmer.
 
17-Time All American Div. 1 NCAA Swimming, swimming for University of Arizona, Tucson, AZ.
Represented Sweden in World and European Championships.
Silver medalist in 4×100 m freestyle relay in Moscow World Championship (short course) and Berlin European Championship (long course).
Multiple Swedish champion.

Clubs 
 Malmö KK
 SK Poseidon, Lund

References

1979 births
Swedish male freestyle swimmers
Living people
Swimmers at the 2004 Summer Olympics
Olympic swimmers of Sweden
Arizona Wildcats men's swimmers
Malmö KK swimmers
SK Poseidon swimmers
Sportspeople from Lund